Virtual geographic environments (VGEs) are geographic analysis tools. A VGE is a multi-user, intelligent virtual environment which represents an actual geographic feature; it is used for geo-spatial analysis, geo-visualization, and geography-related planning and decision making, as well as for training, education, and entertainment.

Further reading 
 Hui Lin, Min Chen, Guonian Lv. 2013. Virtual Geographic Environment: A Workspace for Computer-Aided Geographic Experiments. Annals of the Association of American Geographers, 103(3): 465-482. 
 Hui Lin, Min Chen, Guonian Lu, Qing Zhu, Jianhua Gong, Xiong You, Yongning Wen, Bingli Xu, Mingyuan Hu. 2013. Virtual Geographic Environments (VGEs): a New Generation of Geographic Analysis Tool. Earth-Science Reviews,126:74-84.
 Yin, L. and Hastings, J. 2007. “Capitalizing on Views: Assessing Visibility Using 3D Visualization and GIS Technologies for Hotel Development in the City of Niagara Falls, USA” Journal of Urban Technology, 14(3), pp59–82. 
 Yin, L. 2010. “Integrating 3D Visualization and GIS in Planning Education,” Journal of Geography in Higher Education, 34(3), pp419–438. 

Cartography